is a railway station on the West Japan Railway Company (JR West) Kansai Main Line (Yamatoji Line) in the town of Ikaruga, Ikoma District, Nara Prefecture, Japan.

Layout
There are 2 side platforms serving 2 tracks on the 1st level.

Surrounding
Hōryū-ji (1.5 km north from the station)
Tomio River
Yamato River
Ikaruga Town Hall
Japan National Route 25
Samitagawa Station on Kintetsu Tawaramoto Line (2.5 km south-west of Horyuji Station)

History 
Station numbering was introduced in March 2018 with Hōryūji being assigned station number JR-Q32.

Stations next to Horyuji

References 

Railway stations in Japan opened in 1890
Railway stations in Nara Prefecture